The 2012 European Taekwondo Championships were held in Manchester, England, from May 3 to May 6, 2012.

Medal table

Medal summary

Men

Women

References

External links 
 European Taekwondo Union

European Taekwondo Championships
2012 in taekwondo
2012 in European sport
2012 in English sport
International taekwondo competitions hosted by England